Collinia oregonensis is a species of parasitoid ciliates of the Colliniidae family. It is known to infect the krill Euphausia pacifica, Thysanoessa spinifera, and Thysanoessa gregaria off the coast of Oregon and Washington. It caused a mass mortality of  E. pacifica in June 2001 at the base of Astoria Canyon.

References

Protists described in 2006
Oligohymenophorea